Adaleres is a genus of broad-nosed weevils in the beetle family Curculionidae. There are at least three described species in Adaleres.

Species
These three species belong to the genus Adaleres:
 Adaleres flandersi Van Dyke, 1935 i c g b
 Adaleres humeralis Casey, 1895 i c g b
 Adaleres ovipennis Casey, 1895 i c g b
Data sources: i = ITIS, c = Catalogue of Life, g = GBIF, b = Bugguide.net

References

Further reading

 
 
 
 

Entiminae
Articles created by Qbugbot